In linguistics, according to J. Richard et al., (2002), an error is the use of a word, speech act or grammatical items in such a way that it seems imperfect and significant of an incomplete learning (184). It is considered by Norrish (1983, p. 7) as a systematic deviation which happens when a learner has not learnt something, and consistently gets it wrong. However, the attempts made to put the error into context have always gone hand in hand with either [language learning and second-language acquisition] processe, Hendrickson (1987:357) mentioned that errors are ‘signals’ that indicate an actual learning process taking place and that the learner has not yet mastered or shown a well-structured [linguistic competence|competence] in the target language.

All the definitions seeme to stress either on the systematic deviations triggered in the language learning process, or its indications of the actual situation of the language learner themselves, which will later help monitoring, be it an applied linguist or particularly the language teacher to solve the problem, respecting one of the approaches argued in the Error Analysis (Anefnaf 2017). The occurrence of errors doesn't only indicate that the learner has not learned something yet, but also it gives the linguist the idea of whether the teaching method applied was effective or it needs to be changed.

According to Corder (1976), errors signify three things: first to the teacher, in that the learner tells the teacher, if they have undertaken a systematic analysis,  how far towards that goal the learner has progressed and, consequently, what remains for them to learn; second, they provide the researcher with evidence of how language is learned or acquired, and what strategies or procedures the learner is employing in their discovery of the language; third, (and in a sense this is their most important aspect) they are indispensable to the learner himself/herself, because the making of errors can be regarded as a device the learner uses in order to learn (p. 167). The occurrence of errors is merely a sign of ‘the present inadequacy of our teaching methods’(Corder 1976, p. 163).

There have been two schools of thought when it comes to error analysis and philosophy; the first one, according to Corder (1967) linked the error commitment with the teaching method, arguing that if the teaching method was adequate, the errors would not be committed; the second, believed that we live in an imperfect world and that error correction is something real and the applied linguist cannot do without it no matter what teaching approach they may use.

Errors vs. mistakes 
Chomsky (1965) made a distinguishing explanation of competence and performance on which, later on, the identification of mistakes and errors will be possible, Chomsky stated that ‘’We thus make a fundamental distinction between competence (the speaker-hearer's knowledge of his language) and performance (the actual use of language in concrete situations)’’ ( 1956, p. 4). In other words, errors are thought of as indications of an incomplete learning, and that the speaker or hearer has not yet accumulated a satisfied language knowledge which can enable them to avoid linguistics misuse. Relating knowledge with competence was significant enough to represent that the competence of the speaker is judged by means of errors that concern the amount of linguistic data they have been exposed to, however, performance which is the actual use of language does not represent the language knowledge that the speaker has. According to J. Richard et al (2002), people may have the competence to produce an infinitely long sentence but when they actually attempt to use this knowledge (to “perform”) there are many reasons why they restrict the number of adjectives, adverbs, and clauses in any one sentence (2002, 392).

The actual state of the speaker somehow involves and influences the speaker's performance by either causing a good performance or mistakes. Thus, it is quite obvious that there is some kind of interrelationship between competence and performance; somehow, a speaker can perform well if they have had already satisfied linguistic knowledge. As a support to this, Corder (1967) mentioned that mistakes are of no significance to “the process of language learning’’ (P. 167).

Error analysis approach
Before the rise of error analysis approach, contrastive analysis had been the dominant approach used in dealing and conceptualizing the learners’ errors in the 1950s, this approach had often gone hand in hand with concept of L1 Interference and precisely the interlingual effect (Anefnaf Z. 2017), it claimed that the main cause of committing errors in the process of second language learning is the L1, in other words, the linguistic background of the language learners badly affects the production in the target language or second language.

X. Fang and J. Xue-mei (2007) pointed out that contrastive analysis hypothesis claimed that the principal barrier to second language acquisition is the interference of the first language system with the second language system and that a scientific, structural comparison of the two languages in question would enable people to predict and describe which are problems and which are not. Error analysis approach overwhelmed and announced the decline of the Contrastive Analysis which was only effective in phonology; and, according to J. Richard et al. (2002), EA developed as a branch of Linguistics in the 1960s and it came to light to argue that the mother tongue was not the main and the only source of the errors committed by the learners. In addition, Hashim, A. (1999) mentioned that the language effect is more complex and these errors can be caused even by the target language itself and by the applied communicative strategies as well as the type and quality of the second language instructions.

The aim of EA according to J. Richard et al. (2002) is, first, to identify strategies which learners use in language learning, in terms of the approaches and strategies used in both of teaching and learning. Second, to try to identify the causes of learners’ errors, that is, investigating the motives behind committing such errors as the first attempt to eradicate them. Third, to obtain information on common difficulties in Language Learning, as an aid to teaching or in the preparation of the teaching materials,

The two major causes of error, coined by the error analysis approach, are the Interlingual error which is an error made by the Learner's Linguistic background and Native language interference, and the Intralingual error which is the error committed by the learners when they misuse some Target Language rules, considering that the error cause lies within and between the target language itself and the Learners false application of certain target language rules.

Error analysis in SLA was established in the 1960s by Corder and colleagues.  Error analysis (EA) was an alternative to contrastive analysis, an approach influenced by behaviorism through which applied linguists sought to use the formal distinctions between the learners' first and second languages to predict errors. Error analysis showed that contrastive analysis was unable to predict a great majority of errors, although its more valuable aspects have been incorporated into the study of language transfer. A key finding of error analysis has been that many learner errors are produced by learners making faulty inferences about the rules of the new language.

Error analysts distinguish between errors, which are systematic, and mistakes, which are not. They often seek to develop a typology of errors. Error can be classified according to basic type:  omissive, additive, substitutive or related to word order. They can be classified by how apparent they are: overt errors such as "I angry" are obvious even out of context, whereas covert errors are evident only in context. Closely related to this is the classification according to domain, the breadth of context which the analyst must examine, and extent, the breadth of the utterance which must be changed in order to fix the error. Errors may also be classified according to the level of language: phonological errors, vocabulary or lexical errors, syntactic errors, and so on. They may be assessed according to the degree to which they interfere with communication: global errors make an utterance difficult to understand, while local errors do not. In the above example, "I angry" would be a local error, since the meaning is apparent.

From the beginning, error analysis  was beset with methodological problems. In particular, the above typologies are problematic: from linguistic data alone, it is often impossible to reliably determine what kind of error a learner is making. Also, error analysis can deal effectively only with learner production (speaking and writing) and not with learner reception (listening and reading). Furthermore, it cannot account for learner use of communicative strategies such as avoidance, in which learners simply do not use a form with which they are uncomfortable. For these reasons, although error analysis is still used to investigate specific questions in SLA, the quest for an overarching theory of learner errors has largely been abandoned. In the mid-1970s, Corder and others moved on to a more wide-ranging approach to learner language, known as interlanguage.

Error analysis is closely related to the study of error treatment in language teaching. Today, the study of errors is particularly relevant for focus on form teaching methodology.

In second language acquisition, error analysis studies the types and causes of language errors. Errors are classified according to:
 modality (i.e., level of proficiency in speaking, writing, reading, listening)
 linguistic levels (i.e., pronunciation, grammar, vocabulary, style)
 form (e.g., omission, insertion, substitution)
 type (systematic errors/errors in competence vs. occasional errors/errors in performance)
 cause (e.g., interference, interlanguage)
 norm vs. system

Types of errors  
Linguists have always been attempting to describe the types of errors committed by the language learners, and that is exactly the best way to start with, as it helps out the applied linguist to identify where the problem lies. According to Dulay et al. (1982) errors take place when the learner change the surface structure in a particularly systematic manner (p. 150), thus, the error, no matter what form and type it is, represent a damage at the level of the target language production.

Errors have been classified by J. Richard et al. (2002) into two categories. The Interlingual Error and the Intralingual Error, those two elements refer respectively to the negative influence of both the speaker's native language, and the target language itself.

Interlingual error is caused by the interference of the native language L1 (also known as interference, linguistic interference, and crosslinguistic influence), whereby the learner tends to use their linguistic knowledge of L1 on some Linguistic features in the target language, however, it often leads to making errors. The example, provided by J. Richard et al. (2002) ‘’ the incorrect French sentence Elle regarde les (“She sees them”), produced according to the word order of English, instead of the correct French sentence Elle les regarde (Literally, “She them sees”). (P. 267) shows the type of errors aroused by the negative effect of the native language interference.

Intralingual error is an error that takes place due to a particular misuse of a particular rule of the target language, it is, in fact, quite the opposite of Interlingual error, it puts the target language into focus, the target language in this perspective is thought of as an error cause. Furthermore, J. Richard, et al. (2002) consider it as one which results from ‘’faulty or partial’’ learning of the target language. (p.267) thus the intralingual error is classified as follow:

Overgeneralizations: in linguistics, overgeneralizations error occur when the speaker applies a grammatical rule in cases where it doesn’t apply. Richard et al, (2002) mentioned that they are caused ‘’by extension of target language rules to inappropriate context.’’ (P.185). this kind of errors have been committed while dealing with regular and irregular verbs, as well as the application of plural forms. E.g. (Tooth == Tooths rather than teeth) and (he goes == he goed rather than went).

Simplifications: they result from learners producing simpler linguistic forms than those found in the target language, in other words, learners attempt to be linguistically creative and produce their own poetic sentences/utterances, they may actually be successful in doing it, but it is not necessary the case, Corder (as cited in Mahmoud 2014:276) mentioned that learners do not have the complex system which they could simplify. This kind of errors is committed through both of Omission and addition of some linguistic elements at the level of either the Spelling or grammar. A. Mahmoud (2014) provided examples based on a research conducted on written English of Arabic-speaking second year University students:

 Spelling: omission of silent letters:
 no (= know) * dout (= doubt) * weit (weight)
 Grammar:
 Omission:
 We wait ^ the bus all the time.
 He was ^ clever and has ^ understanding father.
 Addition:
 Students are do their researches every semester.
 Both the boys and the girls they can study together.

Developmental errors: this kind of errors is somehow part of the overgeneralizations, (this later is subtitled into Natural and developmental learning stage errors), D.E are results of normal pattern of development, such as (come = comed) and (break = breaked), D.E indicates that the learner has started developing their linguistic knowledge and fail to reproduce the rules they have lately been exposed to in target language learning.

Induced errors: as known as transfer of training, errors caused by misleading teaching examples, teachers, sometimes, unconditionally, explain a rule without highlighting the exceptions or the intended message they would want to convey. J. Richard et al. (2002) provided an example that occurs at the level of teaching prepositions and particularly ‘’ at ‘’ where the teacher may hold up a box and say ‘’ I am looking at the box ‘’, the students may understand that ‘’ at ‘’ means ‘’ under ‘’, they may later utter ‘’ the cat is at the table ‘’ instead of the cat is under the table.

Errors of avoidance: these errors occur when the learner fail to apply certain target language rules just because they are thought of to be too difficult.

Errors of overproduction: in the early stages of language learning, learners are supposed to have not yet acquired and accumulated a satisfied linguistic knowledge which can enable them to use the finite rules of the target language in order to produce infinite structures, most of the time, beginners overproduce, in such a way, they frequently repeat a particular structure.

Steps 
According to linguist Corder, the following are the steps in any typical EA research:
 collecting samples of learner language
 identifying the errors
 describing the errors
 explaining the errors
 evaluating/correcting the errors
collection of errors:
the nature and quantity of errors is likely to vary depending on whether the data consist of natural, spontaneous language use or careful, elicited language use.

Corder (1973) distinguished two kinds of elicitation:clinical and experimental elicitation.
clinical  elicitation involves getting the informant to produce data of any sort, for example by means of general interview or writing a composition.
experimental elicitation involves the use of special instrument to elicit data containing the linguistic features such as a series of pictures which had been designed to elicit specific features.

Bibliography 
 Anefnaf. Z ( 2017) English Learning: Linguistic flaws, Sais Faculty of Arts and Humanities, USMBA, Retrieved from https://www.academia.edu/33999467/English_Learning_in_Morocco_Linguistic_Flaws
 Chomsky, N. (1965). Aspects of the theory of syntax. Cambridge, MA: MIT Press. P. 4
 Corder, Pit. (1967). the significance of learner's errors. International Review of Applied Linguistics, 161-170
 Dulay, H., Burt, M., & Krashen, S.D. (1982). Language two. New York: Oxford University Press. p. 150
 Edje, J (1989). Mistakes and Correction. London: Longman. P. 26
 Fang, X. & Xue-mei, J. (2007). Error analysis and the EFL classroom teaching: US-China education review, 4(9), pp. 10–14.
 Hashim, A. (1999). Crosslinguistic influence in the written English of Malay undergraduates: Journal of Modern Languages, 12, (1), pp. 59–76.
 Hendrickson, J.M. (1987). Error correction in foreign language teaching: Recent theory, research, and practice. In M.H. Long & J.C. Richards (Eds.), Methodology in TESOL: A book of readings. Boston: Heinle & Heinle. p. 357
 Norrish, J. (1983). Language learners and their errors. London: Macmillan Press. P. 7
 Richards, J. C. & Schmidt, R. (2002). Dictionary of language teaching and applied linguistics (3rd Ed.). London: Longman.
 Richards J. C., & Rodgers T. S.(2001). Approaches and Methods in Language Teaching. (2nd edition), Cambridge University Press: Cambridge, UK. P. 153

See also
Error (linguistics)
Error treatment (linguistics)
Second language acquisition

References

Applied linguistics
Second-language acquisition
Speech error